USS Quail may refer to the following ships of the United States Navy:

  was laid down 14 May 1918 by the Chester Shipbuilding Co., Chester, Pennsylvania.
  which was laid down by the Savannah Machine and Foundry Co., Savannah, Georgia.

 

United States Navy ship names